The Aqua Augusta, which was also called the Aqua Alsietina, was an aqueduct supplying ancient  Rome. Owing to severe drought, the Emperor Augustus built the Aqua Augusta in or around 33 BC in order to supplement the Aqua Marcia, and then later the Aqua Claudia when required.  However, the aqueduct was poorly designed and most of it collapsed in 27 BC.

The aqueduct, perhaps via a branch, also fed the town of Feronia as mentioned in inscriptions found there.

References

External links
 University of Utrecht
 University of Chicago

Augusta